The Haughton-McIver House is a historic home located at Gulf, Chatham County, North Carolina. It is part of the Chatham County Multiple Resource Area (or MRA). Built in the 1840s, it was added to the National Register of Historic Places on July 5, 1985. The house was built as a hotel for guests of the Haughton Plantation.

References

External links
History of house at bellehavre.com

Buildings and structures in Chatham County, North Carolina
Hotels in North Carolina
Houses on the National Register of Historic Places in North Carolina
Houses completed in 1842
National Register of Historic Places in Chatham County, North Carolina